Vermilion County or Vermillion County is the name of several counties in the United States:

 Vermilion County, Illinois
 Vermillion County, Indiana
 Vermilion Parish, Louisiana

See also
 County of Vermilion River, Alberta, Canada